The Long Island Game Farm, situated at 489 Chapman Boulevard in Manorville, New York, was established in 1969 by Stanley and Diane Novak.

Today the Game Farm is home to over 200 animals. For many people, visiting the game farm is a yearly tradition. The Long Island Game Farm is one of the oldest and most well-known establishments in Manorville, and has been one of the town's major landmarks since its opening. 2021 marked its 52nd season as the largest combined children's zoo and wildlife park on Long Island.

2021: New Rescued Tortoise Exhibit Sponsored by Symbiotic Landscaping and Property Management of Center Moriches. 
2021: Welcome Mason our toddler Albino Wallaby who will join our brother and sister wallabies this spring.
2021 - Mid May Arrival: Welcome our new year old Giraffe! 
2021: Gift Shop Sponsored by East Bay Builders Inc. of Center Moriches.
2021: Comfort Station Shed Sponsored by NY Shed Inc. of Mattituck.

External links

Zoos in New York (state)
Buildings and structures in Suffolk County, New York
Tourist attractions in Suffolk County, New York